Anastasia Lazariuc (born 6 July 1953 Băcioi, Chișinău, Moldova) is a singer.

External links
Biography
 http://ava.md/07-evrosoqz/0922-anastasiya-lazarqk-vozmushena-povedeniem-ruminskih-paparacci-.html

1953 births
Living people
20th-century Moldovan women singers
Soviet women singers
Musicians from Chișinău
21st-century Moldovan women singers